Robin Mark Richardson (born 26 June 1942) is a Canadian former politician and Vancouver Islander separatist/activist who was a Progressive Conservative member of the House of Commons of Canada. He represented the Toronto, Ontario riding of Beaches from 1979 to 1980. He is the founder and current leader of the Vancouver Island Party.

Background
Richardson's profession is an economist, once working with the Fraser Institute. At one time, he was a minister for a Christian church in Esquimalt.

Politics
Richardson represented Ontario's Beaches electoral district which he won in the 1979 federal election. After serving his only term, the 31st Canadian Parliament, he was defeated in the 1980 federal election by Neil Young of the New Democratic Party.

In September 2000, he unsuccessfully challenged incumbent Esquimalt—Juan de Fuca Member of Parliament Keith Martin for the Canadian Alliance nomination in that riding. Richardson was particularly critical of Martin's pro-choice position on abortion, while Martin had finished in fourth place during the Canadian Alliance leadership campaign earlier that year. Richardson managed Stockwell Day's successful leadership campaign within Esquimalt—Juan de Fuca.

In June 2016, he started the Vancouver Island Party and serves as leader. The party seeks to make Vancouver Island Canada's 11th province.

Electoral record

References

External links
 

1942 births
Living people
Canadian Protestant ministers and clergy
Canadian economists
Members of the House of Commons of Canada from Ontario
Politicians from Vancouver
Progressive Conservative Party of Canada MPs